William Howard Taft High School is a former New York City high school in the southwest section of the Bronx, whose building now houses small specialized high schools. The school was operated by the New York City Department of Education.

The Taft school campus is located on Sheridan Avenue and 172nd Street in the Bronx.

History 
Founded in the 1940s, Taft originally served the largely homogeneous population of the surrounding area. In the post-war years of the forties, fifties and sixties. Notable graduates included director Stanley Kubrick, producer Jerry Weintraub, novelist Judith Rossner, and singers Eydie Gormé, Chuck Negron, Luther Vandross and Alan Merrill.

Demographic and the advent of specialized magnet schools brought about shifts in enrollment. During the Abraham Beame (1974–1977) and Edward Koch (1978–1989) administrations, citywide, crime rates were high and unfavorable publicity accelerated the decline of the school. By the early 1970s, Taft H.S. earned a reputation as a "failing school" with many of the problems of other high schools in poor, marginalized neighborhoods in New York City.

Entering the 1990s, as a non-selective high school, it was unable to compete with the newer schools housing magnet programs that attracted prime students from throughout the borough. Crime intimidated vibrant young professionals from teaching at the high school. The danger was highlighted in May 1997, when Jonathan Levin, an English teacher at the school and the son of former Time Warner chairman Gerald M. Levin, was murdered by a former student in his Manhattan apartment.

Of the 629 students attending Taft in the 1990s, the majority were Hispanic and African-American. On any given day, attendance hovered around 86%.  The impoverished community, lacking in political clout or a cohesive PTA, was provided 10 truancy officers, rather than improved education strategies. The last graduating class of Taft High School was in June 2008.

Transformation 
Within the same building, the previously identified "failing school" has been transformed into a series of small specialized high schools to meet modern career needs.  The specialty schools are:

 Bronx High School for Medical Science
 Bronx High School of Business
 Bronx Collegiate Academy (formerly Bronx Expeditionary Learning High School)
 Claremont International High School
 DreamYard Preparatory School
 Jonathan Levin High School for Media and Communications
 The Urban Assembly Academy for History and Citizenship for Young Men
 New Directions Secondary School

Notable alumni 
 Eddie Carmel (born Oded Ha-Carmeili, 1936–1972), Israeli-born entertainer
 Arthur J. Cooperman (born 1933), lawyer and politician
 Irwin Dambrot (1928–2010), basketball player
 Eydie Gormé (1928–2013), pop singer
 Richard Gottehrer (born 1940),  songwriter, record producer and record label executive
 Artie Green, basketball player
 Joe Hammond, streetball basketball player
 Louise Hay (née Schmir, 1935–1989), French-born mathematician
 Barbara Kalik (née Bennett, born 1936), politician
 Stanley Kubrick (1928–1999), film director, producer, screenwriter, and photographer
 Gerald M. Levin (born 1939), mass-media businessman
 Ed Roman (1930–1988), college basketball player
 Judith Rossner (1935–2005), novelist
 Joanna Russ  (1937–20), science fiction writer
 Ken Rudin, radio journalist
 Vic Ziegel (1937–2010), sports writer, columnist, and editor
 Luther Vandross (1951–2005), singer, songwriter, and record producer

References

External links 
 New York City Board of Education page
 2002–2003 annual school report
 Article by Michael Winerip
 School profile and article  from Insideschools.org (also source of new schools in the building)
 Article on pregnant students

Taft
Taft
Taft
Taft